is a publishing label affiliated with the Japanese publishing company Hobby Japan. It was established in July 2006 and is a light novel label that is aimed at a young adult male readership. Hobby Japan publishes a bimonthly light novel magazine titled Charano!.

Light novels published under HJ Bunko

A

B

C

D

F

G

H

I

J

K

L

M

N

O

P

Q

R

S

T

U

W

Y

Z

External links
HJ Bunko & Charano!'s official website 

 
Book publishing company imprints